Uruguay sent a team of 22 athletes to compete in the 2009 Summer Universiade held in Belgrade, Serbia from July 1 to July 12, 2009.

Football

Uruguay has qualified a men's team in the football competition.

Each nation must submit a squad of 20 players, with a minimum of two goalkeepers.

Group C

Classification 9-16 places

Classification 9-12 places

Final 11-12 places

Swimming

References

2009 in Uruguayan sport
2009
Nations at the 2009 Summer Universiade